Hadji Hussein Mponda (born 27 September 1958) is a Tanzanian CCM politician and Member of Parliament for Ulanga West constituency since 2010.

References

1958 births
Living people
Tanzanian Muslims
Chama Cha Mapinduzi MPs
Tanzanian MPs 2010–2015
Minaki Secondary School alumni
Tosamaganga Secondary School alumni
Mzumbe University alumni
Alumni of the London School of Hygiene & Tropical Medicine